Kehot Publication Society is the publishing division of the Chabad-Lubavitch movement.

History
Kehot was established in 1941 by the sixth Rebbe of Chabad-Lubavitch, Rabbi Yosef Yitzchak Schneersohn. In 1942, Rabbi Yosef Yitzchak appointed his son-in-law, Rabbi Menachem Mendel Schneerson (who became the seventh Rebbe in 1951) as director and editor-in-chief.

Prior to the establishment of Kehot, printed editions of Chabad texts were limited. Since its founding, Kehot published many volumes of both Hasidic texts and general Jewish literature, growing significantly as an established publisher of Jewish books published in Hebrew, Yiddish, English, Russian, Spanish, French, Italian, Portuguese, Dutch, German, Persian and Arabic.

Rabbi Menachem Mendel served as editor for many of the early Kehot publications. 
In a 1946, he wrote of his editorial work for Jewish holiday literature published in French and in English. He edited both Jewish educational literature for children as well as volumes of Hasidic discourses.

Rabbi Menachem Mendel also worked on publishing old manuscripts from the previous Rabbis of Chabad. In the first years he mainly focused on the works of the fourth Chabad Rebbe, the Rebbe Maharash also writing a biography on his life. Rabbi Schneerson also published the encyclopedic work of Chaim Hezekiah Medini the Sdei Chemed, with rearranging it and adding indices In 1956 he began publishing the discourses of the First Lubavitcher Rebbe the Alter Rebbe, a project he later related as "time consuming".

Publication 
Kehot is one of the largest orthodox publishing houses in America publishing over 600 new titles in the last 80 years.

This publishing house is known for properly indexing their works (not so common in Jewish publishing).

Sefer Hamamarim 

One of the biggest undertakings of Kehot was to publish the discourses of all the Chabad Rebbe's which is an ongoing work numbering hundreds of volumes. Below, the discourses published by Kehot are listed.

Alter Rebbe:
 Sefer Hamaamarim - discourses of the first Lubavitcher Rebbe mainly according to year (27 Volumes) 
 Torah Or/Likutei Torah - discourses prepared by the third Lubavitcher Rebbe (2 volumes)
Mitteler Rebbe:
 Discourses and books by the second Rebbe of Chabad (33 volumes)
Tzemach Tzedek:
 Or Hatorah - discourses written by the third rebbe of chabad (41 volumes)
 Sefer Halikkutim - works of the Tzemach Tzedek reorganized by topic (27 Volumes)
 Hanachos - discourses transcribed by the listeners (as of 2021 2 volumes)
Rebbe Maharash:
 Toras Shmuel - discourses from the fourth lubavitcher Rebbe (21 volumes)
Rebbe Rashab:
 Sefer Hamamarim - discourses from the fifth Lubavitcher Rebbe (30 Volumes as of 2021)
Friediker Rebbe:
 Sefer Hamamarim - discourses from the sixth Lubavitcher Rebbe (21 Volumes as of 2021)
Rabbi Menachem Mendel Schneerson:
 Sefer Hamaamarim Melukat - edited discourses of the current Lubavicher Rebbe (6 volumes)
 Sefer Hamaamarim - transcribed discourses of the current Lubavicher Rebbe (25 volumes as of 2021)

Igros Kodesh 

Igros Kodesh (lit. holy letters) are published letters from the Lubavitcher Rebbes. As of 2021 there are 59 volumes published including 33 volumes of the last Lubavitcher Rebbe.

English Works 
In addition to all the deep Hebrew Chassidic texts, Kehot also focuses on publishing in English for the English reader to benefit from a few of their works, a number of large projects such as: 
 Shulchan Aruch HaRav in English in conjunction with Sichos in English (10 volumes available out of 12)
 Chassidic Heritage Series - a collection of discourses translated into English with an introduction and explanation (25 volumes) 
 Historical Sketches - history of Chabad from the works of the sixth Lubavitcher Rebbe
 The Yosef Marcus Collection - four basic Hebrew text with insights and explanation from Chassidic Philosophy (4 volumes: Pirkei Avot, Haggadah, Tehilim, and Megilat Esther)
 The Kehot Chumash - an interpolated translation and commentary on the Chumash based on the works of the Lubavitcher Rebbe

Name
The name Kehot (קה"ת) is an acronym for Karnei Hod Torah ("the rays of the Torah's glory"), and the three Hebrew letters feature in the publishing house's logo. The letters also refer to the Hebrew year, 5505 (תק"ה), in which the founder of Chabad, Rabbi Schneur Zalman of Liadi, was born.

Awards and honors
 (2017) Best Book Award, Religion – A Time to Heal, 
 (2015) Benjamin Franklin Award Gold Winner – Daily Wisdom, 
 (2005) National Jewish Book Award Finalist – The Last Pair of Shoes,

External links
 Kehot Publication Society (official website)
 Kehot Publication Society (store)
 A selection of books published by Kehot Publication Society online chabad.org
 Kehot Lubavitch Sudamericana - Kehot publications in Spanish www.kehot.com.ar
 Some of the Spanish books published by Editorial Kehot Lubavitch Sudamericana can be found online here es.chabad.org
 Kehot Publication Society YouTube
 Kehot Publication Society Google maps

See also 
 Soncino Press
 Hebrew Publishing Company
 ArtScroll

References

Book publishing companies based in New York (state)
Chabad organizations
Jewish printing and publishing
Jewish organizations established in 1942
Yosef Yitzchak Schneersohn
Publishing companies established in 1942
1942 establishments in the United States
Chabad in the United States
Orthodox Jewish publishing companies